Frossard is a French surname. Notable people with the surname include:

André Frossard (1915–1995), French journalist and writer
Charles Auguste Frossard (1807–1875), French general
Christian Frossard, French slalom canoeist
Denise Frossard (born 1950), Brazilian judge and politician
Edward Frossard (1887–1968), British Anglican priest
Louis Frossard, 18th-century French dancer
Ludovic-Oscar Frossard (1889–1946), French politician
Marie-Renée Frossard, 18th-century French ballet dancer

French-language surnames